Baymina Ankara power station is a gas-fired power station in Ankara Province central Turkey.

References 

Natural gas-fired power stations in Turkey
Buildings and structures in Ankara Province